Sontra is a river of Hesse, Germany. It passes through the town Sontra, and flows into the Wehre in Oetmannshausen.

See also
List of rivers of Hesse

References

Rivers of Hesse
Rivers of Germany